{{Speciesbox
| image = Cylindropuntia spinosior, July Albuquerque.jpg
| status = LC
| status_system = IUCN3.1
| status_ref = <ref>{{cite iucn |title='’Cylindropuntia imbricata |access-date=25 February 2022 |doi=10.2305/IUCN.UK.2020-3.RLTS.T152144A183111167.en |date=29 April 2009}}</ref>
| genus = Cylindropuntia
| species = imbricata
| authority = Haw. (DC.)
| synonyms = Opuntia imbricata}}Cylindropuntia imbricata, the cane cholla (walking stick cholla, tree cholla, or chainlink cactus), is a cactus found in the Southwestern United States and northern Mexico, including some cooler regions in comparison to many other cacti. It occurs primarily in the arid regions of the Southwestern United States in the states of Kansas, Oklahoma, Texas, New Mexico, Arizona, Colorado, and Nevada. It is often conspicuous because of its shrubby or even tree-like size, its silhouette, and its long-lasting yellowish fruits.

Distribution and habitat
The cane cholla's range is the arid regions of Nevada, Arizona, New Mexico, Colorado, Oklahoma, Kansas, and Texas, south to Durango, Zacatecas, and San Luis Potosí.

In parts of its range, often just below the pinyon-juniper belt, it can be abundant, surrounded by low grasses and forbs that are brown most of the year; in such places chollas are conspicuous as the only tall green plant. Plants may form thickets or be spaced at a few times their width in "gardens".

This species is a noxious invasive in Australia in old mining localities and along watercourses. It is known there by the common names of Devil's rope cactus or Devil's rope pear. It is a declared noxious weed in New South Wales and also occurs in Queensland, Northern Territory, Victoria, and South Australia.

Description

The joints, unlike those of some chollas, are hard to detach. The stems are highly tubercular (lumpy) with a pattern of long oval lumps. The width is often similar to or somewhat greater than the height.

There are two kinds of stems or "cladodes": long plagiotropic, bearing flowers at the ends and falling off after a few years, and long orthotropic, primarily serving for support and transport and staying on the plant. Plagiotropic stems grow in a star- or crown-like pattern around a central orthotropic stem.
This species blooms in late spring or early summer. The fruits are yellowish, tubercular like the stems, and shaped something like the frustum of a cone, with a hollow at the wide end where the flower fell off; they are often mistaken for flowers. The plant retains them all winter. They are dry and not tasty, though the Indians of Arizona and New Mexico are said to have eaten them.

In addition to sexual reproduction, the tree cholla reproduces when stem joints fall to the ground and take root. Thus, this species spreads, and its spread is hard to control, especially where animals defecate seeds and carry stem joints stuck to their hide some distance from the parent plant. (Some cows, "cholla eaters", learn to eat cholla fruits despite the pain.) "Waves of invasion" typically occur four or five years after drought combined with grazing, probably because this combination exposes soil on which the stem joints can take root.

Ecology

The fruits are also eaten by various wild birds and mammals, including pronghorn, desert bighorn sheep, and deer. The thorny plants provide escape for cover for many small animals.

The leafcutter bee Lithurgus apicalis has been observed to pollinate the flowers.

Uses
The plants are sometimes grown as ornamentals. Dead stems decay to leave a hollow wooden tube with a pattern of lengthwise slits. These are sometimes used as canes or to make curios. The Roman Catholic Penitentes of New Mexico formerly tied fresh stems to their bare backs in Holy Week processions. The Zuni people use the imbricata'' variety ceremonially.

Images

References

imbricata
Flora of the Chihuahuan Desert
Flora of the Sonoran Deserts
Cacti of the United States
Cacti of Mexico
Flora of Northeastern Mexico
Flora of the Southwestern United States
Flora of Coahuila
Flora of Colorado
Flora of Durango
Flora of Kansas
Flora of New Mexico
Flora of San Luis Potosí
Flora of Texas
Flora of Utah
Flora of Zacatecas
North American desert flora
Drought-tolerant plants
Garden plants of North America